FX is a brand name used by a number of different television channels throughout the world owned by Disney Entertainment, a division of The Walt Disney Company. FX was originally established as a standard or premium cable television channel in the United States but has expanded worldwide.

Current channels

Canada
On August 6, 2011, Rogers Sports & Media entered into a licensing agreement with FX Networks to launch FX Canada as a pay television channel. The network, which launched on November 1, 2011, features a mix of FX original series; acquired American movies and series; and original Canadian programming and sporting events (as required by the Canadian content rules imposed by the Canadian Radio-television and Telecommunications Commission). FX Canada's broadcast license requires that 15% of its programming consist of Canadian content in its first year, 20% in its second year and 25% by its third year.

On May 18, 2018, Remstar Media Group entered into a separate licensing agreement to carry a French language FX-branded programming block on the channel Max.

 FX
 FXX

Greece
 FX is a Greek channel launched on December 31, 2009. On October 1, 2012, the channel was replaced by Fox. On March 15, 2023, Fox was replaced again by FX, along with Fox Life becoming FX Life.

 FX
 FX Life

Latin America
 FX Networks Latin America includes FX.

Turkey
FX was launched in Turkey on April 14, 2008, on the D-Smart digital platform. It is also available on the Teledünya and Tivibu digital platforms.

Former channels

Asia
In 2004, Fox Networks Group Asia and STAR TV (through a distribution agreement) partnered to launch FX Asia. The channel is divided into four services: a national channel distributed throughout much of the continent and three regional channels serving South Korea and Philippines. The channel was shut down on October 1, 2021, with most of its content shifting to the Star content hub on Disney+ (for Singapore, Philippines, Hong Kong and Taiwan) and Disney+ Hotstar (for Southeast Asia region outside Singapore and Philippines).

 FX Southeast Asia
 FX Philippines

Australia
 FX was an Australian channel launched on February 26, 2012. On February 28, 2018, FX ceased broadcasting on Foxtel, and all of its programs moved to Fox Showcase.

India
 FX was an Indian channel operated from 2012 to 2017.

Italy
 FX was an Italian channel launched on May 21, 2006. Due to the lowest ratings, the channel was closed on July 1, 2011.

Latin America
 FX Networks Latin America included FXM, which was shut down on April 1, 2022.

Middle East
 FX was launched in the Middle East as a free-to-air channel along with the rest of the Fox-branded channels (which include National Geographic, Nat Geo Wild, STAR Movies, Fox Movies, Fox Rewayat, Fox Family Movies, Fox Action Movies, STAR World, FOX, FX, Fox Life, Fox Crime, Channel V International and Baby TV), the channels later became encrypted instead of free, as a part of beIN network. The channel closed on December 1, 2022, along with Fox Family Movies and Fox Crime.

Portugal
 FX was a Portuguese channel launched in 2005. In November 2015, the channel was rebranded as Fox Comedy.

South Africa
 FX was a South African pay-TV satellite channel, part of the StarSat offering on May 1, 2010. It was shut down on October 3, 2016, along with Fox Crime, which closed down on September 30, 2016, to be replaced by Fox Life

UK and Ireland
 FX was a British and Irish channel launched on January 12, 2004. In 2013 the channel was rebranded as Fox. It later closed down on July 1, 2021, with most of its content moving to the Star content hub on Disney+.

See also
 FX (TV channel) 
 Fox (international) 
 Fox Crime
 Fox Life
 Fox Sports International

References

Disney television networks
Fox Networks Group
International
Men's mass media
Men's interest channels